James Bretherton (5 January 1862 – 9 June 1926) was an English cricketer active in the 1890s, playing in six first-class cricket matches. He was a right-handed batsman and right-arm fast-medium bowler.

Having played club cricket for Boughton Hall since 1890, Bretherton made his debut in first-class cricket when he was selected to play for the Liverpool and District cricket team against Yorkshire at Aigburth in 1890. He made five further appearances in first-class cricket for Liverpool and District to 1894, all of which came against Yorkshire, with exception of his second match of 1893 which came against the touring Australians. He scored a total of 165 runs in his six matches, averaged 16.50, with a high score of 50. With the ball he took 24 wickets, which came at an identical average to his batting. His best figures were 5/30 in his debut match, which was also his only career five wicket haul. He later made a single appearance for Cheshire in the 1895 Minor Counties Championship against Worcestershire.

He died at Raby, Cheshire on 9 June 1926.

References

External links
James Bretherton at ESPNcricinfo
James Bretherton at CricketArchive

`

1862 births
1926 deaths
People from Whiston, Merseyside
English cricketers
Liverpool and District cricketers
Cheshire cricketers